Falavarjan County is in Isfahan province, Iran. The capital of the county is the city of Falavarjan. At the 2006 census, the county's population was 232,019 in 60,613 households. The following census in 2011 counted 247,014 people in 71,802 households.  At the 2016 census, the county's population was 249,814 in 77,213 households.

Administrative divisions

The population history and structural changes of Falavarjan County's administrative divisions over three consecutive censuses are shown in the following table. The latest census shows three districts, six rural districts, and eight cities.

The center of this county is the city of Falavarjan. It has a special place due to its close proximity to the metropolis of Isfahan. Also, due to its proximity to the Zobahan highway and ease of connection with other neighboring cities, it is one of the busiest suburbs of Isfahan. The people of this city are Persian speakers with Isfahani accent. The bridge of this city which is called Vargon is the only double arched bridge of Zayandehrood.

The most important historical structures in the county are in the Pirbakran Mausoleum, and the historical mosque of the village of Oshtorjan (now the city of Imanshahr).

Notable centers
The Islamic Azad University of Falavarjan was founded in Falavarjan County, 1984.

The city of Falavarjan has a long history and is one of the oldest central parts of Isfahan. It has also been a place for many migratory animals and birds due to its unique and pleasant climate.

Transportation
The main route passing through the county is Zobahan Freeway, connecting population centres to Isfahan.

Falavarjan County has its own Transit Bus system named Falavarjan County Municipalities Mass Transit Organization, running 7 routes connecting the county's cities to Isfahan and one route to Khomeynishahr.

Falavarjan city is one of the historical cities of Isfahan province with a total area of 319 square kilometers.The city has a wide bank of the Zayandeh River, which is very important in this regard.The soil of Falavarjan in the past was very coastal and fertile, and this has led to great prosperity in agriculture, especially rice cultivation.However, despite the recent drought, the city's cultivated lands gradually declined.

It is bounded on the east by Isfahan city, on the north by Khomeini Shahr city, on the south by Mobarakeh city, on the northwest by Najafabad city and on the west by Lenjan city.

There is a village called Barzan near Falavarjan today, which was drunk through the material of Kopan.Later, due to the bridge over the river, it was renamed Vergan Bridge, later Varjan Bridge, and finally Falavarjan.

Its population is over 250,000 people.Existence of numerous industries, being located on the banks of Zayandeh River, long history and high quality agricultural products such as rice, wheat and summer crops have made this city have a special place.This city has 8 cities named Zazran, Falavarjan, Qahdarijan, Kalishad, Sudarjan, Pirbakran, Baharan, Imanshahr, Abrisham city and 60 villages, which according to the historical monuments in these cities have a long cultural history.

In the past, especially since the constitutional period, a number of Bakhtiari people have also settled in Falavarjan. Historical monuments of this city can be Imamzadeh Younes Ibn Azharban Aqeel Ibn Musa Kazem of Zazran city, the house of evidence of Zafra village, old Falavarjan bridge and Grand Mosque and Baba Mahmoud Sohr Firuzan bridge and Largan pigeon towers and Hoyeh village and stone lions and Baba Mahmoud Sohr Firuzan mosque and mosque Ashtarjan and the tomb of Pirbakran and the tomb of Imamzadeh Shah Abul Ghasem Sohr Firoozan, Seyyed Mohammad Largan and Zeid Ibn Hassan were named.

Also, from the Safavid period, a wall started near the city of Pirbakran and continued until the end of the city of Imanshahr (Minadasht).Over time, this mud wall has been destroyed, but part of this wall is still left. Falavarjan has been less developed due to its proximity to the city of Isfahan. It is noteworthy that the historical bridge of Faladerjan has been built with the use of eggs and salts such as cement, etc., and if the Zayandeh River does not reach these bridges, they may be destroyed due to drought.Unfortunately, this city is surrounded by drought.

References

 

Counties of Isfahan Province